Nebria cordicollis heeri is a subspecies of ground beetle in the Nebriinae subfamily that is endemic to Switzerland.

References

cordicollis heeri
Beetles described in 1903
Beetles of Europe
Endemic fauna of Switzerland